Idana marginata is a species of picture-winged fly (Ulidiidae) found in the United States and Canada. It is the largest ulidiid fly in eastern North America.

References

Ulidiidae